Donbot may refer to:

 Donbot (Futurama), a character in Futurama
 Donbot botnet, a botnet mostly involved in sending e-mail spam